Elmer D. Morse (April 6, 1844 – February 13, 1921) was a Republican member of the Wisconsin State Senate.

Biography
Morse was born in Madison, New York on April 6, 1844. He came to Princeton, Wisconsin with his parents at the age of three.

He entered the Army at the age of 16 in 1861, serving four years, and attending school for one year after being discharged. He was later employed in the lumber, grain, and produce business. At the organization of the Princeton State Bank in 1893, he was elected vice-president. When the Montello State Bank was organized a few years later, he became its president. While he had always taken an active part in politics, he had never held a political office, until he was elected to the Wisconsin State Senate. Morse died on February 13, 1921.

References

People from Madison, New York
People from Princeton, Wisconsin
People of Wisconsin in the American Civil War
Businesspeople from Wisconsin
Republican Party Wisconsin state senators
1844 births
1921 deaths